Bakersfield, California, held a general election for mayor on March 2, 2004. It saw the reelection of incumbent mayor Harvey Hall.

The election coincided with the California presidential primaries. Since Hall obtained a majority in the initial round of voting, no runoff was necessitated.

Results

References 

Bakersfield
Mayoral elections in Bakersfield, California
Bakersfield